Sansi may refer to:
 Sansi people, an ethnic group of India
 Sansi language, an Indo-Aryan language
 Sansi, Benin, in Borgou Department, Benin
 Sansi Township, Xingtai, Hebei, China
 Three Bureaus (三司; Sānsī), an office in imperial Chinese governments
 Wu Sansi (died 707), Chinese official

See also 
 Sanci (disambiguation)
 Sancy (disambiguation)
 Sanzi, contemporary Chinese painter and designer

Language and nationality disambiguation pages